Kyle Allen McCarty (born March 5, 1992), known professionally as Kyle Maack, is an American R&B and soul singer and podcaster most known for being the first artist signed to Otis Williams of the legendary Motown quintet The Temptations. Maack's debut release, Shakey Ground, was noted for his cover of The Temptations' 1984 single "Treat Her Like a Lady" which featured the 2017 version of the group singing background vocals.

Military and music career 
Maack grew up Berlin, New Jersey, and sang in different groups and bands throughout elementary and high school.  At age 19, he enlisted in the United States Air Force where he auditioned for and joined the branch's elite entertainment unit, Tops in Blue, in 2014.  After an impromptu audition for Otis Williams in October 2016, Maack signed a recording contract with Williams' label, 10/30 International.  Maack's sole release on the label was an EP featuring covers of Temptations songs including the title track "Shakey Ground", "Treat Her Like a Lady" featuring the Temptations, and "All I Need" featuring Otis Williams and fellow Air Force vet, Tops In Blue alum, and current Temptations member Terry Weeks.  Shakey Ground's last track, "Here I Am", is the only original song on the project and was co-written by Maack and Williams. The project was produced by Dave Darling who would later go on to produce The Temptations' 2018 album, All the Time.

Radio and podcast 
Maack gained further recognition as an intern on The Preston & Steve Show, which broadcasts weekday mornings on WMMR in Philadelphia; singing and producing musical comedy bits and jingles for various segments.  He joined the cast of Preston & Steve as their video producer in 2022. Maack created and hosted the TriJam Podcast from 2018 to 2022 with fellow Philadelphia artists Shae Davis, Jo Rivers and standup comedian, Will Wright.

References 

1992 births
Living people
American rhythm and blues singers
Singers from New Jersey
People from Berlin, New Jersey